Yamasá is a municipality (municipio) of the Monte Plata province in the Dominican Republic. It includes the municipal district (distrito municipal) of Los Botados. 
Yamasa is north of the capital city of Santo Domingo. The Rio Ozama, one of Dominican Republic's longest rivers, passes through Yamasa.

Climate

Farming
Primarily a rural agriculture community, sugar cane, plantains and mangoes are common staples grown in Yamasa.

Famous citizens
Camilo Doval (born 1997), baseball relief pitcher for the San Francisco Giants
Baseball Player César Hernández who played for the Cincinnati Reds was born in Yamasá in 1966.
Journalist Enny Pichardo An Emmy Award nominee, former Spokesperson/Press Secretary for the NYS Attorney General; and currently Host/Producer of #EnNYConMás, on youtube (www.ennyconmas.tv); previously a national news-correspondent for NBC/Telemundo Network and Noticiero Univisión was born in Yamasá in 1982.

References 

Populated places in Monte Plata Province
Municipalities of the Dominican Republic